Dore is a 1995 Indian Kannada-language romance drama film directed by Shivamani and produced by M. Chandrashekar. The film stars Shiva Rajkumar, Hema Panchamukhi and Bharathi. The story is based on the novelist Ku. Veerabhadrappa's novel Beliya Hoogalu.

The film's score and soundtrack was scored by Hamsalekha and the cinematography was by Krishna Kumar.

Cast 

 Shiva Rajkumar 
 Hema Panchamukhi
 Bharathi
 Srinivasa Murthy
 Ponnambalam 
 Dheerendra Gopal
 Sudheer
 Girija Lokesh
 Ashalatha
 Vaijanath Biradar 
 Rajanand 
 Bank Suresh 
 Bharath Kumar 
 Pailwaan Venu 
 Aiyappa M. M
 Dingri Nagaraj
 Vasudeva Rao
 Kashi
 Shankar Ashwath

Soundtrack 
The soundtrack of the film was composed by Hamsalekha.

References

External links 

 Dore film 1995
 

1995 films
1990s Kannada-language films
Indian romantic drama films
1995 romantic drama films
Films based on Indian novels
Films scored by Hamsalekha

kn:ದೊರೆ